Geoffrey Howard Bourne (17 November 1909 – 19 July 1988) was an Australian-American anatomist and primatologist. In particular, he studied the adrenal gland, conducting pioneering work in histochemistry.

Bourne was director of Yerkes National Primate Research Center at Emory University from 1962 until 1978. Prior to coming to Emory he had taught histology at the University of London and physiology at Oxford University. He received his doctorates from Oxford University (D.Sc., 1935; Ph.D., 1943) and was a fellow of the Royal Society of Medicine.

Bibliography
  (ed.) (1942) Cytology and Cell Physiology
  (1949) The Mammalian Adrenal Gland
  (1956) Biochemistry and Physiology of Bone
  (1957) Vitamin C in the Animal Cell
  (ed.) (1961) Physiological and Pathological Aging
  (1962) Structure and Function of Muscle
  (1970) Ape People
  (1974a) Non-Human Primates and Medical Research
  (1974b) Primate Odyssey
  (1975) The Gentle Giants: The Gorilla Story'
  (ed.) (1977) Human and Veterinary Nutrition  (ed.) (1988) Sociological and Medical Aspects of NutritionNotes

References

External links
Geoffrey Bourne, Encyclopædia Britannica'' 

1909 births
1988 deaths
Australian anatomists
Primatologists
20th-century American zoologists
Australian emigrants to the United States